The A. Gary Anderson Graduate School of Management (commonly known as AGSM), is a part of the UCR School of Business located at the University of California, Riverside. Current offerings include MBA, Ph.D., Master of Finance and Master of Professional Accountancy (MPAc) programs.

History
UCR first established the Graduation School of Administration in 1970. The
school was subsequently renamed the Graduate School of Management in 1982.
In 1994, the A. Gary Anderson Family Foundation donated $5 million to the
school, which was renamed the A. Gary Anderson Graduate School of
Management. In 2008, the school was renamed the School of Business, housing both the undergraduate business program and the A.
Gary Anderson Graduate School of
Management.

Programs

MBA Program
The MBA program launched in 1983.
Offered in the A. Gary Anderson Graduate School of Management, the MBA program enrolls about 80 students per year .

In 2010, MBA student interns participated in the first ever study of foreign direct investment in Riverside County. They worked with the Office of Foreign Trade at the Riverside County Economic Development Agency.

Ph.D. Program
The Ph.D. Program launched fall 2011. The program is interdisciplinary, focusing on management and marketing. The first cohort is composed of six students.

Master of Professional Accountancy (MPAc) Program
A Master of Professional Accountancy (MPAc) program was approved for launch fall 2012.

Executive MBA Program
In 2009, SoBA launched an Executive MBA program. Typical applicants to the 21-month program have seven to 10 years of career experience minimum. The first cohort was composed of managers in finance, distribution, a CPA, and physicians. The program enrolls about 20-25 students per year.

Students meet on alternating weekends at the UCR Palm Desert Graduate Center, and are required to attend a week-long residency and an
international study trip. In 2010, the EMBA cohort traveled to Shanghai for its international residency.

Rankings
The Anderson School MBA program was ranked 89th by U.S. News & World Report. It was listed in the Princeton Reviews's Best Business Schools in 2010 and 2011. Its undergraduate business program was ranked 32nd among public universities by U.S. News & World Report in September 2011. The School's undergraduate business program was ranked by Business Week in March 2011; it was one of only six programs in California so ranked (and one of only three programs among public institutions in California).

See also
 List of University of California, Riverside people

References

External links
  University of California, Riverside
  UCR School of Business
  A. Gary Anderson Graduate School of Management 

University of California, Riverside
Educational institutions established in 1970
1970 establishments in California